Ursula Channel is a channel in the North Coast region of the Canadian province of British Columbia. It separates the east coast of Gribbell Island from the mainland. It was first charted in 1793 by Joseph Whidbey, master of the Discovery during George Vancouver’s 1791-95 expedition.

References

Channels of British Columbia
North Coast of British Columbia